Nes Church may refer to:

Nes Church ruins, the preserved church ruins of the medieval Nes Church building in Nes Municipality in Viken county, Norway
Nes Church (Akershus), a church in the Nes Municipality in Viken county, Norway
Nes Church (Bjugn), a church in Ørland Municipality in Trøndelag county, Norway
Nes Church (Buskerud), a church in the Ringerike Municipality in Viken county, Norway
Nes Church (Gran), a church in Brandbu in Gran Municipality in Innlandet county, Norway
Nes Church (Nesbyen), a church in the Nesbyen Municipality in Viken county, Norway
Nes Church (Ringsaker), a church in Ringsaker Municipality in Innlandet county, Norway
Nes Church (Telemark), a church in Midt-Telemark Municipality in Vestfold og Telemark county, Norway
Nes Church (Vestland), a church in Luster Municipality in Vestland county, Norway